Miss Andorra is a national Beauty pageant in Andorra.

History
Miss Andorra competed at the Miss World 2003, supported by the Andorra Tourism Organisation. Andorra has not competed at the Miss Europe contest since 2003. Since 2006, Miss Andorra has not been organised due to lack financial support.

Titleholders

See also
Miss World
Miss Europe

References

Andorra
Recurring events established in 2003
Entertainment events in Andorra
2003 establishments in Andorra